The Brave Little Abacus (also stylized as Brave Little Abacus) was an American emo band formed in Sandown, New Hampshire, in 2007. The band consisted of vocalist, guitarist, and drummer Adam Demirjian, bassist Andrew Ryan, and keyboardist Zach Kelly-Onett, but were later joined by Nick Morrone on drums in 2011.

Career
The Brave Little Abacus first released a demo in 2008 titled Demo?. That same year, they released a split with fellow New Hampshire musician Matt Aspinwall. In August 2009, the band self-released their first album, titled Masked Dancers: Concern In So Many Things You Forget Where You Are (often shortened to Masked Dancers.)  In May 2010, the band self-released their second and final album, titled Just Got Back From the Discomfort—We're Alright. The album was listed at number 27 on Spin magazine's list of the "30 Best Emo Revival Albums, Ranked". The Brave Little Abacus's final release, an EP titled Okumay, was released in 2012 on Quote Unquote Records, featuring a cover of the song Introducing Morrissey by The Ergs. They played their last show at the Vic Geary Center in Plaistow, New Hampshire, on January 28, 2012.

Post-breakup: 2012–present 
Demirjian and Morrone are currently members of Boston-based power pop band Me in Capris, and Kelly-Onett has pursued a solo career as a modern classical musician. Demirjian is the drummer for Boston-based power pop band Lilith. In recent years, many publications and musicians have cited the Brave Little Abacus as an under-appreciated band.

Members

Former members
 Adam Demirjian – lead vocals, guitars (2007–2012), drums, percussion (2007–2011)
 Zach Kelly-Onett – keyboards, backing vocals (2007–2012)
 Andrew Ryan – bass guitar (2007–2012)
 Nick Morrone – drums, percussion (2011–2012)

Former touring members
Evan Briggs – guitar, backing vocals (2012)

Timeline

Discography

Studio albums
Masked Dancers: Concern in So Many Things You Forget Where You Are (2009, self-released)
Just Got Back From the Discomfort—We're Alright (2010, self-released)

EPs
Okumay (2012, Cat Dead, Details Later/Quote Unquote Records)

Splits
Matt Aspinwall/The Brave Little Abacus (2008, self-released)

Demos
Demo? (2008, self-released)

References

American emo musical groups
Rock music groups from New Hampshire
Musical groups established in 2007
Musical groups disestablished in 2012